Sins of Jezebel is a 1953 American historical drama film produced by Sigmund Neufeld and directed by Reginald Le Borg. It stars Paulette Goddard as Jezebel, the biblical queen of the northern kingdom of Israel during the 9th century BC. The film was shot in Ansco Color for widescreen projection.

Plot 
In 9th century BC Israel, the prophet Elijah advises king Ahab not to marry Jezebel, an idolatrous princess of Phoenicia. Ahab sends for Jezebel, however, and commands Jehu, his captain, to escort her caravan safely to Jezreel. Once Jehu meets Jezebel, he immediately becomes attracted to her and she confuses him for Ahab. Jezebel finally arrives at Jezreel and is greeted by Ahab who, stunned by her beauty, provides her with an individual chamber until they marry. On her wedding night, Jezebel evades Ahab and pursues Jehu, whom she seduces.

Jezebel establishes the cult of Baal, her idol, in Israel and builds a temple. Jehovah, the God of the Israelites, delivers drought upon Israel because of the idolatry and sends his prophet Elijah to reprimand the people. Elijah prays to Jehovah and the drought ends.

Cast

Production 
Paulette Goddard was signed to star in the film on April 22, 1953. Margia Dean was cast as Deborah on May 11. The film began shooting on May 13. Interior scenes were shot at KTTV Studios and exterior scenes were shot at Corriganville Ranch.

Release

Critical reception 
Sins of Jezebel received mixed reviews from critics. The News and Eastern Townships Advocate described the film as "a spectacular Robert L. Lippert, Jr. production in gorgeous new Ansco Color." The Toledo Blade also praised the film's color cinematography, but questioned the film's low budget by writing, "the desire was strong, but the cash was weak."

As for the film's cast, The News and Eastern Townships Advocate praised Goddard's "fascinating performance" as she was "ideally cast" as Jezebel, and The Toledo Blade commended the "competent job" of John Hoyt as Elijah.

See also 
 List of historical drama films

References

External links 
 
 
 
 
 

1953 films
1953 drama films
Films set in the 9th century BC
Films based on the Hebrew Bible
Films set in ancient Israel
Religious epic films
Lippert Pictures films
1950s historical drama films
American historical drama films
Films directed by Reginald Le Borg
1950s English-language films
1950s American films